This is a list of settlements in Cheshire by population based on the results of the 2011 census. The next United Kingdom census will take place in 2021. In 2011, there were 25 built-up area subdivisions with 5,000 or more inhabitants in Cheshire, shown in the table below.

Population ranking

See also 

Civil parishes in Cheshire
List of places in Cheshire

References 

Settlements by population
Settlements by population
Settlements by population
Settlements by population
Settlements by population
Cheshire
Settlements by population